Solid trigonometry may refer to:

solid geometry, geometry of three-dimensional Euclidean space
spherical trigonometry, deals with the trigonometric functions of the sides and angles of the spherical polygons